Nadgaon is a village in Bodwad taluka of Jalgaon district, Maharashtra, India. The village is 55 kilometres away from Jalgaon city.

Nadgaon is the ancestral village of former President of India Pratibha Patil.

Education
The village have a primary Marathi school.

References

Villages in Jalgaon district